KLN College of Engineering is an Autonomous self-financed engineering college in southern Tamil Nadu. It is situated on the southeastern outskirts of Madurai and built on a  plot with multistory buildings. It is a Sourashtra minority college. It is the first self-financing co-educational Engineering College in Madurai, started in 1994 by Shri. K.L.N Krishnan. It has received the approval of All India Council for Technical Education, New Delhi and is affiliated with Anna University, Chennai.

Students wear a uniform. The college runs placement programs within industry and government.

The campus is located 15 km from the Madurai Airport, 11 km from the Madurai Railway station and is well connected by buses with all parts of Tamilnadu state.

Buildings
The college consists of six double-storied laboratory buildings and three single-storied workshops and machine shops. There is a men's dormitory, mess block, canteen, post office and clinic on campus, and a women's dormitory off campus.

The college has land allocated for outdoor games and an indoor stadium, with a gymnasium being planned and there is a standard football pitch onsite.

Academic programs

KLNCE offers 7 undergraduate, 5 postgraduate programmes (ME, MCA, MBA) in all Engineering and Science streams.

List of Departments
The following are the departments in the college:
Mechanical Engineering
Electronics and Electrical Engineering
Electronics and Communication Engineering
Computer Science and Engineering
Information Technology
Data Science and AI
Electronics and Instrumentation Engineering
Automobile Engineering
Physics
Chemistry
Mathematics
English
Physical Education
Business Administration

Notable Students
C. Indhumathy, IAS, Director of Minority Welfare, Uttar Pradesh

External Links

Citations

Other Colleges Under KLN Group of Institutions
 KLN College of Information Technology
 KLN Polytechnic College
 KLN B.Ed College
 KLN Vidyalaya CBSE School
 KLN College of Arts and Science

Engineering colleges in Tamil Nadu
Colleges in Madurai
Science and technology in Madurai
Colleges affiliated to Anna University
Educational institutions established in 1994
1994 establishments in Tamil Nadu